Yponomeuta cagnagella, the spindle ermine, is a moth from the family Yponomeutidae, the ermine moths. The wingspan of the moth ranges from 19 to 26 millimetres. The head is white. Forewings are white; four longitudinal series of few black dots, first not reaching middle, second beginning near before middle, lowest including 4-7 dots; some additional black dots before termen; cilia white. Hindwings are dark grey. The larva is pale greyish-yellowish; spots black; head black.

Flight time ranges from the end of June to October. The moth is attracted to light.

Host plant
The host plant of this moth is European spindle. Other ermine moths that use this plant as their host are Yponomeuta plumbella and Yponomeuta irrorella.

References

Moths described in 1813
Yponomeutidae
Moths of Europe
Moths of the Middle East